Patrick P. M. "Pat" Doherty (born 12 April 1962) born in Croydon is an English former professional feather/super feather/lightweight boxer of the 1980s, who won the Irish super featherweight title, and Commonwealth lightweight title, and was a challenger for the British Boxing Board of Control (BBBofC) Southern Area featherweight title against Clyde Ruan, and BBBofC British super featherweight title against John Doherty, his professional fighting weight varied from , i.e. featherweight to , i.e. lightweight.

References

External links

Image - Pat Doherty

1962 births
English male boxers
Featherweight boxers
Lightweight boxers
Living people
People from Croydon
Boxers from Greater London
Super-featherweight boxers